Akash Raj (born 24 October 2002) is an Indian cricketer. He made his Twenty20 debut on 15 January 2021, for Bihar in the 2020–21 Syed Mushtaq Ali Trophy. He made his List A debut on 20 February 2021, for Bihar in the 2020–21 Vijay Hazare Trophy.

References

External links
 

2002 births
Living people
Indian cricketers
Bihar cricketers
Place of birth missing (living people)